Royal Reynolds Jr. (October 17, 1910 – November 24, 2003) was a decorated American brigadier general who served with an American-Filipino guerrilla force on the Japanese-occupied Philippines during World War II. His last assignment was as the Assistant Commander of the Infantry School at Fort Benning, Georgia.

Biography

Royal Reynolds Jr. was born on October 17, 1910 in California as a son of future Brigadier General Royal Reynolds and his wife Romietta Redman Reynolds. His uncle was Major General Charles R. Reynolds, who served as Surgeon General of the United States Army between 1935 and 1939.

Royal Jr. attended the United States Military Academy at West Point, New York and graduated in 1933. He was then commissioned a second lieutenant and assigned to the infantry.

During World War II, Reynolds was assigned to the 57th Infantry Regiment, stationed at Philippines, where he was appointed commanding officer of the 1st Battalion. After the defeat by Japanese during the Battle of Philippines in May 1942, Reynolds refused to surrender and spent the remainder of the war as a guerrilla. For his service during the war, Reynolds received the Bronze Star Medal and Combat Infantryman Badge.

After the war, Reynolds remained on active duty in the Army and subsequently served with the 7th Infantry Division in the Korean War. He commanded a regiment during this conflict and was decorated with another Bronze Star Medal with "V" Device, Legion of Merit and also Silver Star for gallantry in action.

He also attended the Command and General Staff College at Fort Leavenworth, Kansas, and the Army War College.

In his late military career, Reynolds was promoted to the rank of brigadier general and served as Assistant Commander of the Infantry School at Fort Benning, Georgia. He received another Legion of Merit for his service in this capacity and finally retired from the military service in 1963.

Brigadier General Royal Reynolds Jr. died on November 24, 2003, at the age of 93 and is buried at Arlington National Cemetery, Virginia along with his father and mother.

Decorations

Here is the ribbon bar of Brigadier General Reynolds Jr.:

References

1910 births
2003 deaths
United States Army generals
United States Military Academy alumni
United States Army Command and General Staff College alumni
United States Army War College alumni
United States Army personnel of World War II
United States Army personnel of the Korean War
Recipients of the Silver Star
Recipients of the Legion of Merit
Burials at Arlington National Cemetery
People from California